Amaral's Brazilian gecko (Hemidactylus brasilianus) is a species of nocturnal geckos from the arid Jalapão Region, Minas Gerais/Bahia (Brazil). It is a bluish-gray, oviparous tree-dwelling species, feeding on herbivorous insects and other invertebrates. It has immovable, or fixed eyelids. Being nocturnal, it has vertically oriented pupils. They have a life span of about 6–13 years and are sexually mature at 6–9 months old. They are about 13 cm long and 2 cm wide. They cannot change their colour. When attacked by a bird, they run in circles, confusing the enemy. When attacked by a ground animal, they climb a high tree, run in tall grass, or try to hide under leaves, rocks, and other things they can find.   They are one of the smartest geckos on the earth, and are not endangered.

References

Further reading

 Amaral, A. do 1935. Um novo genero e duas novas especies de Geckonideos e uma nova raça de Amphisbaenideo, procedentes do Brasil Central. Mem. Inst. Butantan 9: 253-256.
 Carranza, S. and E.N. Arnold 2006. Systematics, biogeography, and evolution of Hemidactylus geckos (Reptilia: Gekkonidae) elucidated using mitochondrial DNA sequences. Molecular Phylogenetics and Evolution 38 (2): 531-545
 Rösler, H. 2000. Kommentierte Liste der rezent, subrezent und fossil bekannten Geckotaxa (Reptilia: Gekkonomorpha). Gekkota 2: 28-153
 Vitt, L. J.; Caldwell, J. P.; Colli, G. R.; Garda, A. A.; Mesquita, D. O.; França, F. G. R. e Balbino, S. F. 2002. Um guia fotográfico dos répteis e anfíbios da região do Jalapão no Cerrado brasileiro. Norman, Oklahoma: Special Publications in Herpetology. San Noble Oklahoma Museum of Natural History

Hemidactylus
Reptiles of Brazil
Reptiles described in 1935

fr:Briba
nl:Briba